Kim Jin-hee is the name of:

 Kim Jin-hi (born 1957), South Korean composer and komungo player
 Kim Jin-hee (footballer) (born 1981), South Korean footballer
 Kim Jin-hee (tennis) (born 1981), South Korean tennis player